David Seabrook (19 December 1960 Hemel Hempstead, Hertfordshire – 18 January 2009 Canterbury, Kent) was a British crime writer and journalist.

Life 
Born in 1960 at Hemel Hempstead, David was the only child of Leslie Frank Seabrook (an insurance broker) and his wife Barbara Elizabeth Daphne (Frostick). Seabrook studied English and American literature at the University of Kent at Canterbury gaining an MA with a dissertation on Marcel Proust. Subsequently, he worked as a teacher of English as a foreign language in Greece. Until his death he lived alone at Westside Apartments in Canterbury. He was discovered dead in his flat by Kent police. There is unconfirmed speculation that Seabrook was murdered. However, this has never been officially established.

Career
Seabrook is known for his extensively researched books rich with literary and historical associations on previously untouched or assumedly insignificant subjects and locations.

In his book Jack of Jumps Seabrook attempts to identify Jack the Stripper, a serial killer who murdered eight prostitutes in West London in the early 1960s. Seabrook gives a meticulous account of the police work; however, the murderer remains unknown, although the book contains insinuations as to his identity.

All the Devils are Here is Seabrook's account of Kent's unglamorous seaside towns entwined with local literary and celebrity history.

Seabrook also appeared in two films  - 'fictional documentaries' - by Chris Petit and Iain Sinclair: 'The Cardinal and the Corpse' (1992) and 'Asylum' (2000).

At the time of his death Seabrook was working on a book about the life and mysterious suicide of the show business solicitor David Jacobs.

Works
All the Devils are Here Granta Books (2002) 
Jack of Jumps Granta Books (2006)

See also

Goodbye Piccadilly, Farewell Leicester Square

References

External links
"He framed a dead man". Article by Johnny Sharp with picture of Seabrook
"Great Britain: Jack the Stripper". Time. 8 May 1964.
Hooked on murder Review by David Jays of Jack of Jumps
Tart vision Review by Chris Petit of Jack of Jumps
Midnight in the garden of England Review by Andy Beckett of All the Devils Are Here
A situationist by the seaside Review by Brian Dillon of All the Devils Are Here
How TS Eliot found inspiration at Margate About Seabrook's account of TS Eliot in Margate
The seductively seamy side of 1960s London Review by Mark Sanderson of Jack of Jumps
Is David Seabrook dead? Overview of Seabrook's work by Stewart Home

1960 births
2009 deaths
English non-fiction crime writers
English crime fiction writers
English historical novelists
People from Canterbury
English male novelists
20th-century English novelists
20th-century English male writers